Whitlocks End railway station is a railway station on the North Warwickshire Line located next to, and named after the hamlet of Whitlock's End in the West Midlands of England. It lies a short distance from several villages: Tidbury Green and the new village of Dickens Heath in the West Midlands, and Major's Green and Hollywood in Worcestershire. The station, and all trains serving it, are operated by West Midlands Trains.

History
The station was opened by the Great Western Railway on 6 June 1936 to cater for the increased housing developments in the area, and was originally called Whitlocks End Halt, the suffix was dropped on 6 May 1968. The original 1936 station had short and low platforms, this led to it being completely rebuilt in 1999 at a cost of £800,000.

This was done in order to alleviate traffic congestion at Shirley station, by encouraging commuters to drive to Whitlocks End, which is the next station along the line. This in turn led to the station car park being extended in September 2011 to accommodate increased demand.

The 275-space free station car park is managed by Transport for West Midlands. Network Rail have recently completed a £60,000 improvement scheme that included the doubling of bicycle storage capacity from 12 to 24.

Services
During Monday to Saturday daytimes:

 3 trains per hour northbound to Birmingham Moor Street and Birmingham Snow Hill continuing to Stourbridge Junction, with some trains continuing onward to Kidderminster and Worcester.  
 1 train per hour southbound to Stratford-upon-Avon (two services also terminate here from the Birmingham direction).

On Sundays, there is an hourly service to  via Snow Hill and to Stratford-upon-Avon.

References

External links

Entry for this station on Warwickshire railways
Entry for this station on Rail around Birmingham & West Midlands

Railway stations in Solihull
DfT Category F2 stations
Former Great Western Railway stations
Railway stations in Great Britain opened in 1936
Railway stations served by West Midlands Trains